The Falemauga Caves are large natural caverns in a series of lava-tunnels situated in the Tuamasaga district along the central ridge of Upolu island in Samoa. The caves have been studied by archaeologists in Samoa with evidence of human occupation in pre-history. They were also used as a place of refuge by the people of Tuamasaga.

The caves were explored and excavated in the early 1940s by New Zealand anthropologist Derek Freeman who published his report in the Journal of the Polynesian Society in 1944. Platforms constructed of stacked rocks, charcoal, stone adzes and marine shells were found in the caves.

In the Samoan language, the name Falemauga can be broken down into two words, fale which means 'house' and mauga which means 'mountain.'

Location

The Falemauga Caves are located in an inland area called Falemauga, about 6 miles south west from Apia, Samoa's capital. Entrance to the main system of tunnels is about five and a half miles south (inland) of the coastal village of Malie.

History
When Freeman studied the caves in 1941, they were all located on a plantation owned by a 'Mr. S. V. Mackenzie of Apia.' During his field work, Freeman stayed in Mackenzie's house in Falemauga, located about 900 feet from the caves. Prior to Mackenzie, the land had formerly been owned by a German, Herr Paul Ludwig Schroeder, whose son Mr. H. H. Schroeder, discovered the caves in 1914. The caves were visited in August 1914 by members of the New Zealand Expeditionary Force, which was occupying the country at the time. In 1920, they were visited by  Dr. J. Allan Thomson, Director of the Dominion Museum in New Zealand. Other scholars who visited the caves include Jack Golson, who explored the caves in 1957 as well as eminent archaeologist Janet Davidson.

Geology
The caves are part of lava tubes, a result of old lava-flows near an extinct volcano called Sigaele in the island's volcanic interior. The islands of Samoa consist of high volcanic islands which have resulted in geological formations including caves and lava tubes, some which occur as water conduits and forming natural springs around the islands' coastlines, like the Mata o le Alelo Pool on Savai'i island and Piula Cave Pool on Upolu.

Archaeology

The down-break opening had divided from what was once a single tunnel into two distinct sections, one to the north and one to the south. Freeman called the north section the North Cave and the south section the South Cave. The North Cave was a lot longer than the South Cave. Both caves were inhabited by Pe'ape'a (Collocalia francica), a species of swift and by many small bats.

North Cave
Entry into the North Cave was extremely confined and only four and one half feet in height and three feet in width.

South Cave

Findings
Freeman recorded 152 platforms, 129 in the north cave, and 23 in the south cave. He also found numerous umu cook sites, fireplaces, and kitchen-middens as well as several lumps of ele a type of red volcanic rock used as a natural dye for Samoan siapo or tapa, a traditional bark cloth material. He found 5 stone adzes, four in the North Cave and one in the South Cave, a common type of prehistoric adze found in Samoa. A small circular rubbing-stone was found by a platform, which Freeman surmised was used for sharpening and polishing.

See also
 Archaeology in Samoa

References

External links
 The Cave at Falemauga - A story, map and photos taken by a Peace Corps Volunteer in 1977

Archaeological sites in Samoa
Archaeology of Samoa
Caves of Samoa
Tuamasaga